Khari Khari (Quechua, a thorny medical plant, a species of rubus, hispanicized spellings Cari Cari, Kari Kari, Kari-Kari) is a mountain in the Andes in the Potosí Department of Bolivia. It is the second highest elevation in the Potosí mountain range rising up to (5,040 m (16,535 ft). It is also the highest mountain in the Khari Khari mountain range, the northern part of the Potosí mountain range.

Khari Khari lies east of Potosí and north-east of the Khari Khari Lakes.

See also 
 Kari-Kari (caldera)
 Kimsa Kunturiri
 Mawk'a Tampu

References 

Mountains of Potosí Department